Arthropod assault is a medical term describing a skin reaction to an insect bite characterized by inflammation and eosinophilic response.

See also 
 Arthropod bites and stings
 List of cutaneous conditions

References 

Eosinophilic cutaneous conditions